Milton Ernest Hall is a large grade I listed country house in the village of Milton Ernest, Bedfordshire, England. It now serves as a nursing home.

It was built in 1853–58 for Benjamin Helps Starey on the site of a decaying earlier house by church architect William Butterfield, whose sister Ann was married to Starey. Constructed in limestone in a Gothic Revival style, the main block is L-shaped with projecting gables and a high, steep roof containing several dormer windows.

The property passed then through several hands before being sold in 1906 to Lord Ampthill. During the First World War the hall became the home of two of the sons of King George V. After the war it was restored to the Starey family.

During the Second World War the hall was used as a base for Special Operations Executive, a small grass landing strip being laid in the grounds. In 1944 it became the United States Eighth Air Force's support command headquarters. A plaque at the Hall honours the members of the United States Eighth Air Force (including Major Glenn Miller) who were stationed there. The plaque reads: 

After the US Air Force vacated the Hall, it remained empty until 1968, when Ludwik Dobrzański (he died in 1940) purchased the property along with the surrounding grounds for £15,000. The family lived at the Hall until it was sold in 1971.

In 1984 the hall was converted to a nursing home.

In the fields adjoining is a grade II listed brick and tile hexagonal dove-cote.

References

Grade I listed buildings in Bedfordshire
Grade I listed houses
Country houses in Bedfordshire
William Butterfield buildings